Castignano is a comune (municipality) in the Province of Ascoli Piceno in the Italian region Marche, located about  south of Ancona and about  northeast of Ascoli Piceno.

Castignano borders the following municipalities: Appignano del Tronto, Ascoli Piceno, Cossignano, Montalto delle Marche, Montedinove, Offida, Rotella.

Among its churches are the Sanctuary of San Bernardino da Siena and Santi Pietro e Paolo. Its territory is home to the oldest ever Italic language inscription found, the so-called "Stele of Castignano" (7th-6th centuries BC).

References

External links
 Official website

Cities and towns in the Marche